Leave It to the Irish is a 1944 American comedy crime film directed by William Beaudine and starring James Dunn, Wanda McKay and Jack La Rue.

Cast
 James Dunn as Terry Moran, Private Investigator  
 Wanda McKay as Nora O'Brien  
 Jack La Rue as Rockwell, Black Swan Club Owner  
 Dick Purcell as Pat Burke  
 Arthur Loft as J. P. O'Brien, Chief of Detectives  
 Barbara Woodell as Mrs. James Hamilton  
 Vince Barnett as Barney Baker  
 Joseph DeVillard as Henchman Gus  
 Olaf Hytten as The Hamilton Butler  
 Eddie Allen as Slim  
 Dick Scott as Biff  
 Ted Stanhope as Joe

References

Bibliography
 Marshall, Wendy L. William Beaudine: From Silents to Television. Scarecrow Press, 2005.

External links
 

1944 films
1940s crime comedy films
1940s English-language films
American crime comedy films
Films directed by William Beaudine
Monogram Pictures films
American black-and-white films
1944 comedy films
1940s American films